Banff—Airdrie is a federal electoral district in Alberta, Canada, that has been represented in the House of Commons of Canada since 2015.

Banff—Airdrie was created by the 2012 federal electoral boundaries redistribution and was legally defined in the 2013 representation order. It came into effect upon the call of the 42nd Canadian federal election, scheduled for October 2015. The riding was created out of parts of Wild Rose (98%) and Macleod (2%) electoral districts.

Demographics 
According to the 2016 Canadian census, Banff—Airdrie's ethnic demographics were 75.7% White/European, 8.6% Asian 8.2% Aboriginal, 1.7% Black/African, and 1.6% Latin American.

Geography
The riding contains the northern and western exurbs of Calgary, and runs west along the Bow River valley and includes all of Banff National Park.

Profile
The Conservative base of support is in the east of the riding, where they dominate Airdrie, the riding's largest community, and Cochrane, as well as the communities bordering Calgary. The Liberals, NDP and Greens all perform better in the western regions of the riding. Canmore was solidly Liberal in the 2015 election and Banff broke heavily for the left of centre parties.

Members of Parliament

This riding has elected the following members of the House of Commons of Canada:

Election results

References

Alberta federal electoral districts
Airdrie, Alberta
Banff, Alberta